Kristaps is a Latvian masculine given name. It is a cognate of the German name Christoph and may refer to:

Kristaps Blanks (born 1986), Latvian football striker
Kristaps Dārgais (born 1990), Latvian basketball player
Kristaps Grebis (born 1980), Latvian footballer
Kristaps Gulbis (born 1967), Latvian sculptor and artist 
Kristaps Helmanis (1848 – 1892), Latvian vaccinologist and microbiologist
Kristaps Janičenoks (born 1983), Latvian basketball player
Kristaps Lībietis (born 1982), Latvian biathlete and Olympic competitor
Kristaps Mauriņš (born 1991), Latvian luger and Olympic competitor
Kristaps Porziņģis (born 1995), Latvian basketball player
Kristaps Sotnieks (born  1987), Latvian ice-hockey player
Kristaps Valters (born 1981), Latvian basketball guard
Kristaps Veksa (born 1994), Latvian BMX rider
Kristaps Zaļupe (born 1976), Latvian sprint canoer and Olympic competitor
Kristaps Zīle (born 1997), Latvian ice hockey player
Kristaps Zommers (born 1997), Latvian footballer
Kristaps Zvejnieks (born 1992), Latvian skier and Olympic competitor

Latvian masculine given names